Phylus coryli is a species of plant bugs belonging to the family Miridae, subfamily Mirinae. The species is widespread in Europe including the British Isles, but missing in parts of the southern Mediterranean. To the East is found in the Caucasus. It is introduced in North America.It feeds on Corylus avellana.

References

Bugs described in 1758
Taxa named by Carl Linnaeus